In Greek mythology, Autolycus (Ancient Greek: Αὐτόλυκος Autolykos 'the wolf itself') was a successful robber who had even the power of metamorphosing both the stolen goods and himself. He had his residence on Mount Parnassus and was renowned among men for his cunning and oaths.

Family
There are a number of different accounts of the birth of Autolycus. According to most, he was the son of Hermes and Chione or Philonis. In Ovid's version, Autolycus was conceived after Hermes had intercourse with the virgin Chione. Pausanias  instead states that Autolycus' real father was Daedalion. In some accounts, his mother was also called Telauge.

Depending on the source, Autolycus was the husband of Mestra (who could change her shape at will and was a daughter of Erysichthon), or of Neaera, or of Amphithea. He became the father of Anticlea (who married Laertes of Ithaca and was the mother of Odysseus) and several sons, of whom only Aesimus, father of Sinon was named. Autolycus' other daughter was Polymede, mother of Jason, the famous Argonaut who led a group of men to find the coveted Golden Fleece.

Mythology

Adventures 
Autolycus obtained most of the same skills that his supposed father Hermes possesses, such as the arts of theft and trickery. It was said that he "loved to make white of black, and black of white, from a hornless animal to a horned one, or from horned one to a hornless". He was given the gift that his thievery could not be caught by anyone.

Autolycus, master of thievery, was also well known for stealing Sisyphus' herd right from underneath him – Sisyphus, who was commonly known for being a crafty king that killed guests, seduced his niece and stole his brothers' throne and was banished to the throes of Tartarus by the gods.

Heracles, the great Greek hero, was taught the art of wrestling by Autolycus. However, Autolycus was a source of trouble in Heracles' life, because when Autolycus stole some cattle from Euboea and Eurytus, they accused Heracles of the deed; upon going mad from these accusations, Heracles killed them and another one of Eurytus' sons, Iphitus. This led to Heracles serving three years of punishment to repent the deed.

Odysseus' name 
Through Anticleia, Autolycus was also the grandfather of the famous warrior Odysseus, and he was responsible for the naming of the child as well. This happened when the nurse of the child Eurycleia "laid the child upon his knees and spoke, and addressed him: Autolycus, find now thyself a name to give to thy child's own child; be sure he has long been prayed for". Then Autolycus answered: "Since I have been angered (ὀδυσσάμενος odyssamenos) with many, both men and women, let the name of the child be Odysseus".

In popular culture
Although not as well known as many other Greek mythological figures, Autolycus has appeared in a number of works of fiction.

 Autolycus appears as a paragon of thievery in Thomas De Quincey's "On Murder Considered as One of the Fine Arts".
 A comic thief in Shakespeare's The Winter's Tale boasts that he is named after Autolycus and, like the latter's father, Mercury/Hermes, is "a snapper-up of unconsidered trifles".
 A column in the Pall Mall Gazette appeared in the 1890s, entitled "The Wares of Autolycus". One of its contributors, Elizabeth Robins Pennell, commented that it was "daily written by women and I daresay believed by us to be the most entertaining array of unconsidered trifles that any Autolycus had ever offered to any eager world"; she compiled her culinary essays as The Feasts of Autolycus: the Diary of a Greedy Woman (1896).
 Autolycus appears in Diana Wynne Jones' book The Game as a very mischievous brat.
 In the television series Hercules: The Legendary Journeys and Xena: Warrior Princess, Autolycus appears as a comical antihero, portrayed by cult actor Bruce Campbell, who has a kinder heart than he lets on. As the self-proclaimed "King of Thieves", he is depicted as a thief of great cunning but even greater ego which typically results in him getting in over his head in one scenario after another and even getting caught by Hercules. His wardrobe includes a green tunic, possibly in reference to Robin Hood (also known as a thief, particularly in the title of a film featuring Kevin Costner). 
 Autolycus is the name of a fictional racehorse in the 1935 film The Clairvoyant, starring Claude Rains.
 Autolycus is the name of Debbie Aldridge's horse in the BBC Radio 4 series The Archers.
 Autolycus is the name of a midget submarine owned by the Lost Boys, the thieves of Philip Reeve's Mortal Engines series of books.
 Autolycus is the name of a pet jackdaw belonging to the fictional detective Albert Campion in the novels by Margery Allingham.
 Autolycus appears in an episode of the Canadian television series Class of the Titans episode "Bad Blood" voiced by Joseph May. He was hired by Cronus to steal Hercules' last surviving arrow.
 The superhero/trickster figure of Uncle Sam in Robert Coover's The Public Burning (1977, New York, Grove Books) is described in the following terms (p. 7): "American Autolycus, they called him in the Gospels, referring to his cunning powers of conjuration, transmutation, and magical consumption (he can play the shell game, not with a mere pea, but with whole tin mines, forests, oil fields, mountain ranges, and just before Thanksgiving this past year made an entire island disappear!)”.
 Autolycus was the pen name Aldous Huxley used when writing the 'Marginalia′ column in the Athenaeum.
 In the game Age of Empires Online, there is an army of computer-controlled opponents who call themselves the Followers of Autolycus. They must be defeated during several quests of the Greek civilization.
 Autolycus was portrayed by Rufus Sewell in the 2014 movie Hercules.
 Series 4, episode 5 of the British television series Father Brown is entitled "The Daughter of Autolycus".
 The Blue Guitar (John Banville 2015 novel) begins with the line "Call me Autolycus."
 The family of non-tailed dsDNA marine bacteriophages, Autolykiviridae, were named after Autolycus for their elusiveness, which had delayed their discovery (Nature, 2018, doi:10.1038/nature25474).
Autolycus is the playable character of Italian gamebook series Hellas Heroes (Mauro Longo & Francesco di Lazzaro, Edizioni Librarsi), where he is considered the son of Hermes and Chione.
Autolycus is one on the main characters in Power of the Gods, in which he has assumed the human identity of Avery Jones. He is an ally of the god Hestes and best friends with the blind archer Bryndor, who is also a demigod like him.

Notes

References 

Gaius Julius Hyginus, Fabulae from The Myths of Hyginus translated and edited by Mary Grant. University of Kansas Publications in Humanistic Studies. Online version at the Topos Text Project.
Homer, The Iliad with an English Translation by A.T. Murray, Ph.D. in two volumes. Cambridge, MA., Harvard University Press; London, William Heinemann, Ltd. 1924. Online version at the Perseus Digital Library.
Homer, Homeri Opera in five volumes. Oxford, Oxford University Press. 1920. Greek text available at the Perseus Digital Library.
Homer, The Odyssey with an English Translation by A.T. Murray, Ph.D. in two volumes. Cambridge, MA., Harvard University Press; London, William Heinemann, Ltd. 1919. Online version at the Perseus Digital Library. Greek text available from the same website.
Pausanias, Description of Greece with an English Translation by W.H.S. Jones, Litt.D., and H.A. Ormerod, M.A., in 4 Volumes. Cambridge, MA, Harvard University Press; London, William Heinemann Ltd. 1918. Online version at the Perseus Digital Library
Pausanias, Graeciae Descriptio. 3 vols. Leipzig, Teubner. 1903.  Greek text available at the Perseus Digital Library.
Pseudo-Apollodorus, The Library with an English Translation by Sir James George Frazer, F.B.A., F.R.S. in 2 Volumes, Cambridge, MA, Harvard University Press; London, William Heinemann Ltd. 1921. Online version at the Perseus Digital Library. Greek text available from the same website.
Publius Ovidius Naso, Metamorphoses translated by Brookes More (1859-1942). Boston, Cornhill Publishing Co. 1922. Online version at the Perseus Digital Library.
Publius Ovidius Naso, Metamorphoses. Hugo Magnus. Gotha (Germany). Friedr. Andr. Perthes. 1892. Latin text available at the Perseus Digital Library.

External links

 Godchecker - Autolycus: The Prince of Thieves
 Marvel Characters - Captain Autolycus

Children of Hermes
Demigods in classical mythology
Metamorphoses characters
Phocian characters in Greek mythology